Ogden Bay is an Arctic waterway in the Kitikmeot Region, Nunavut, Canada. It is located in the southern Queen Maud Gulf off Nunavut's mainland.

Ogden Bay is the historical home of Ahiagmiut, a Copper Inuit subgroup.

References

Bays of Kitikmeot Region
Bays of the Arctic Ocean
Former populated places in the Kitikmeot Region